María del Carmen Rosario Soledad Cervera y Fernández de la Guerra, Dowager Baroness Thyssen-Bornemisza de Kászon et Impérfalva (born 23 April 1943), popularly known as Carmen "Tita" Cervera or Carmen "Tita" Thyssen, is a Spanish socialite, and art dealer and collector.

Biography
Cervera was born on 23 April 1943 in Barcelona, the daughter of Enrique Cervera Manent and his wife, María del Carmen Fernández de la Guerra Álvarez (d. Madrid, 22 February 1992).

She was Miss Spain in 1961. She married firstly, as his fifth wife, on 6 March 1965 Lex Barker, secondly, in 1975 , divorcing in 1978, and thirdly as his fifth wife, at Daylesford, Moreton-in-Marsh, Gloucestershire, on 16 August 1985, Baron Hans Heinrich Thyssen-Bornemisza.

None of her marriages had issue, but she had a son born out of wedlock, Alejandro (b. Madrid, 24 July 1980), with Manuel Segura. Hans Heinrich adopted her son, known as Alejandro Borja Thyssen-Bornemisza de Kászon et Impérfalva. As a widow, Carmen Cervera has also adopted two twin baby girls (born in 2007 in United States), called María del Carmen and Guadalupe Sabina in July 2007.

In 2013 and 2016 Cervera was exposed by the International Consortium of Investigative Journalists for using complex offshore structures to gain tax advantages.  Her spokesman stressed that she uses tax havens primarily because they give her "maximum flexibility" when she moves art from country to country.

Art collection

She has been an art collector since the 1980s. Items from her collection can be seen at:
 the Thyssen-Bornemisza Museum in Madrid, which includes 200 works from the Carmen Thyssen-Bornemisza Collection 
 the Carmen Thyssen Museum in Málaga, which opened in 2011.

Loans to other museums have been proposed, including a projected arts centre at Nuevo Baztan near Madrid.

In 2012, she sold a valuable painting by English artist John Constable, The Lock.
The painting made a world record price for this artist, as it had done when acquired in 1990.

See also
 Thyssen-Bornemisza Museum
 Thyssen family

References

External links
 
  hola.com
 geneall.net

1943 births
Living people
Miss World 1961 delegates
People from Barcelona
Spanish socialites
Spanish art collectors
Spanish art dealers
Spanish nobility
Spanish female models
Hungarian nobility
German baronesses
People named in the Paradise Papers